Killer Spider (Persian: عنکبوت, romanized: Ankabut) is a 2020 Iranian drama film directed by Ebrahim Irajzad and written by Oktay Baraheni based on the true story of Saeed Hanaei. The film screened for the first time at the 25th Busan International Film Festival.

Cast 
 Mohsen Tanabandeh as Saeed
 Sareh Bayat as Zahra
 Shirin Yazdanbakhsh as Malakeh
 Mahoor Alvand as Afsaneh
 Niousha Alipour as Fatemeh
 Golnoush Ghahramani as Mojgan
 Ali Bagheri as Cyclist
 Mehdi Hosseininia as Driver
 Hamidreza Hedayati Rad
 Javad Yahyavi as The Judge
 Mahdokht Molaei as Victim
 Sahar Abdollahi as Victim
 Yousef Khosravi as Mojtaba
 Hamid Haji Mohammadzadeh as Police officer
 Meysam Damanzadeh as Rahman
 Davood Zakeri as Driver
 Farid Sajjadi Hosseini as Saeed's father in-law

Reception

Accolades

References

External links 

 

Iranian drama films
2020 directorial debut films
2020 films
2020s Persian-language films
2020 drama films